René Jarolín (born 16 September 1981) is a Slovak professional ice hockey forward currently playing for Étoile Noire de Strasbourg in the FFHG Division 1.

Jarolín has previously played in the Slovak Extraliga for HK 36 Skalica, HKm Zvolen, HC Slovan Bratislava, HK Poprad and MsHK Žilina. He also played in the United Kingdom's Elite Ice Hockey League for the Edinburgh Capitals.

References

External links

1981 births
Living people
HC Slovan Bratislava players
Edinburgh Capitals players
Étoile Noire de Strasbourg players
Milton Keynes Lightning players
HK Poprad players
HK 36 Skalica players
Slovak ice hockey forwards
HK Spišská Nová Ves players
MsHK Žilina players
HKM Zvolen players
Sportspeople from Skalica
Slovak expatriate ice hockey people
Slovak expatriate sportspeople in England
Expatriate ice hockey players in England
Slovak expatriate sportspeople in Scotland
Expatriate ice hockey players in Scotland
Slovak expatriate sportspeople in France
Expatriate ice hockey players in France